, also known as Secret Princess, is a Japanese manga series written and illustrated by Norio Tsukudani. It was originally serialized in Ichijinsha's Waai! magazine, but was later featured in three additional magazines published by Ichijinsha: Waai! Mahalo, Monthly Comic Rex and Febri. Collectively, Himegoto was serialized across the four magazines from November 2011 to June 2015 and was collected into six tankōbon volumes.

The story focuses on Hime Arikawa, a high school boy whose sizable debt is paid off by the girls of his school's student council. In exchange, he agrees to join the student council and spend the rest of his high school life dressed as a girl. An anime television series adaptation by Asahi Production aired from July to September 2014. Critics panned it for its characters, its focus on humiliation and shame, and reliance on a single joke throughout the series.

Plot
Forced to assume a large amount of debt from his now-absent parents, Hime is saved by the three girls of his school's student council after he is chased down by debt collectors. In return for paying off his debt, Hime agrees to their conditions of becoming the student council's servant and spending his high school life dressed as a girl.

Characters

The protagonist of the series, Hime is a feminine-looking second-year high school student who gets troubled by debt collectors because his parents have racked up a large amount of debt in his name for constantly traveling overseas. When the student council pays off his creditors, he is obligated to join them as a servant, and must also cross-dress for the rest of his time in high school. While at first he only cross-dresses because he has no other choice, he starts to slowly shows signs of enjoying it, much to the delight of his brother and the student council.
 

18-kin is the student council vice-president. She often forces Hime into unreasonable situations. Her father is the board chairman of the school. Despite how much she enjoys making fun of Hime, she never allows actual harm to come to him. She has feelings for Hime and likes kissing.
 

Unko is the student council president at Shimoshina. She is an intelligent and athletic girl. Although her name is actually , this reminds her of the horror character Sadako, so she prefers to use Unko because she is afraid of ghosts.
 

She is a popular manga artist, and uses Hime as the basis for the title character in her manga . She is sensitive about her small chest and gets upset whenever the issue of size comes up.

Kaguya is Hime's younger brother who cross-dresses by choice because he enjoys the attention he receives from it. He dislikes that 18-kin and the student council pays so much attention to Hime. He is the lead character in the spin-off series Himegoto+. Kaguya joins the public morals committee at his school. He has a number of admirers at school he refers to as his "servants".
 

No. 1 is Kaguya's classmate; her moniker refers to her status as Kaguya's foremost and closest admirer. While she normally dresses as a boy (for Kaguya's sake), when she dresses as a girl, she has a large bust size and is regarded as incredibly pretty. She has known Kaguya for five years and is very close with him. She joined the public morals committee with Kaguya.

Nicknamed , Mitsunaga is a third-year student at Shimoshina High School and is the chairman of the public morals committee. As the head of the Oda family, he is forced to cross-dress until he reaches adulthood due to a family rule. Similar to Kaguya, Mitsunaga dislikes 18-kin due to her lax morals and disregard for his authority.

Hiro is Mitsunaga's classmate and assistant in the public morals committee. His family has served the Oda family for generations as their servants. Due to feeling sorry for Mitsunaga being forced to cross-dress, Hiro willingly dresses as a girl and normally dresses in a maid outfit. Although neither he nor Mitsunaga acknowledge their relationship as anything other than a master and servant throughout the series, they do love each other.

Tadokoro is Hime's classmate and they have been friends since junior high school. He is somewhat of a playboy, but never gets far.

Development
Norio Tsukudani based Himegoto on an earlier four-panel manga she drew for fun during her time as a student. At that time, the main characters that make up the student council were instead members of the drama club. However, Tsukudani decided to change this when developing Himegoto to be serialized in Ichijinsha's Waai! magazine, and she decided it would be easier to manage a cross-dressing character if he was in the student council. Before creating Himegoto, Tsukudani read various works of fiction that featured cross-dressing boys, but many of them featured the boys being paired with other boys. When she proposed the idea of Himegoto, she wanted to pair a cross-dressing boy with girls, which Tsukudani herself wanted to read. In this way, she thought that a variety of different people would enjoy it.

When drawing the manga, Tsukudani aimed to write scenes that were easy to read, something she felt she was unable to do well when the manga's serialization began. What she felt was most important was depicting the characters as cute as possible. When developing the characters, she based the female members of the student council and Tadokoro on friends she had in the drama club when she was a student. However, Hime was created from scratch using Tsukudani's ideals for a cross-dressing boy as a basis for the character including his pink hair, side pigtails, and him being forced to cross-dress. When developing the members of the public morals committee, Tsukudani had already decided on having a pair of cross-dressing brothers, which led to Kaguya's development. Tsukudani's editor suggested making Kaguya the protagonist of the spin-off manga Himegoto+, and she wanted to give Kaguya a partner, so she created No. 1 and thought she might as well make her into a cross-dressing girl. For Mitsunaga and Hiro, she wanted them to cross-dress due to some preconceived issue. Tsukudani was careful to design the characters to maintain a balance between them, including what hair color they would have.

Although Tsukudani kept a notebook with story ideas, she admitted that on many occasions the theme of a chapter was born out of her own daydreams. Once she decided on a theme, she had the characters move around in her head and then worked out the plot and storyboard. Since she had a solid grasp on who the characters were, she noted that they moved around for her on their own. Conversely, if the characters were stiff with a given theme, Tsukudani could not develop an interesting story and moved on to another idea. The theme developed for the manga serialized in Febri had to do with bonus aspects to the story that she was unable to draw in the main serialization, as well as events that occurred between chapters in the main story.

Media

Manga
Himegoto is written and illustrated by Norio Tsukudani. It began serialization in volume seven of Ichijinsha's Waai! magazine on November 25, 2011 as a four-panel comic strip manga and continued until February 25, 2014 when Waai! suspended publication. The spin-off series Himegoto+ was serialized in Waai!s sister magazine Waai! Mahalo between April 25, 2012 and December 25, 2013. Another version of Himegoto was serialized between the December 2013 issue of Ichijinsha's Comic Rex magazine sold on October 27, 2013 and the August 2015 issue sold on June 27, 2015. Tsukudani serialized another version of Himegoto in Ichijinsha's Febri magazine between volume 23 sold on June 20, 2014 and volume 29 sold on June 17, 2015. Ichijinsha published six tankōbon volumes between February 19, 2013 and July 27, 2015. A special edition of volume four was bundled with a drama CD. Ichijinsha published the anthology  on September 3, 2014.

Anime
A 13-episode anime television series adaptation, directed by Takeyuki Yanase and produced by Asahi Production, aired in Japan between July 7 and September 29, 2014 on BS11. Each episode is about five minutes long. The screenplay is written by Kazuho Hyodō, and Masaaki Sakurai based the character design used in the anime on Norio Tsukudani's original designs. The single containing the theme songs was released on March 5, 2014. The series was released on Blu-ray in Japan on November 26, 2014.

An Internet radio show hosted by the members of I My Me Mine to promote the anime called  broadcast 24 episodes between April 16 and September 24, 2014. The show was streamed online every Wednesday and was produced by the Japanese Internet radio station Onsen. Six CD compilation volumes were released between July 1 and October 18, 2014.

Reception
Reviewer Chris Beveridge of The Fandom Post described the anime's short episode format as offering "more direct comedy, quicker hits and more playfulness and abuse when it comes to the gender issues." He initially called the premise "familiar yet fun" with "enough off kilter material" to amuse the audience. By the end of the series, Beveridge noted that its approach focused on humiliation and shame and said that it "works one gag and does its best to run it into the ground as much as possible." Tim Jones at THEM Anime Reviews heavily panned the series, calling the treatment of the student council girls towards Hime as "sinister and tasteless". Jones expressed his frustration with every episode, going on to heavily pan the characters and use of a "terrible one-joke premise". Both Hime and Kaguya did place in the results of a 2016 Goo Rankings survey of the most popular otokonoko characters in Japan, however, ranking 5th and 20th, respectively.

Notes and references
Notes

Manga volumes

 
 
 
 
 
 

References

External links
Himegoto at Ichijinsha 
Anime official website 

2011 manga
2012 manga
2013 manga
2014 manga
2014 anime television series debuts
Asahi Production
Comedy anime and manga
Cross-dressing in anime and manga 
Ichijinsha manga
School life in anime and manga
Seinen manga
Shōnen manga
Yonkoma